Janet Soergel Mielke (born June 30, 1937) is an American politician and secretary.

Born in Edgerton, Wisconsin, Mielke graduated from Milton Union High School and was a secretary. Mielke served in the Wisconsin State Assembly as a Democrat in 1971 and 1973.

Notes

1937 births
People from Edgerton, Wisconsin
Women state legislators in Wisconsin
Living people
21st-century American women
Democratic Party members of the Wisconsin State Assembly